Gold and Glitter is a 1912 American silent drama film co-directed by  D. W. Griffith and Frank Powell. Lillian Gish, in the leading female role, was praised for its variety of emotion, in comparison to her previous roles.

Cast
 Elmer Booth as The Husband
 Grace Lewis as The Wife
 Lionel Barrymore as The Lover
 Lillian Gish as The Young Woman
 William J. Butler as The First Older Brother
 Walter P. Lewis as The Second Older Brother (as Walter Lewis)
 Gertrude Bambrick
 Harry Carey as Lumberman
 John T. Dillon as Lumberman
 Dorothy Gish as On Street
 Joseph Graybill as Lumberman
 Alfred Paget as In Canoe
 W. C. Robinson as Lumberman

See also
 Harry Carey filmography
 D. W. Griffith filmography
 Lillian Gish filmography
 Lionel Barrymore filmography

References

External links

1912 films
1912 short films
1912 drama films
American black-and-white films
Silent American drama films
American silent short films
Films directed by D. W. Griffith
Films directed by Frank Powell
1910s American films